Pouteria bapeba is a species of plant in the family Sapotaceae. It is endemic to Brazil.  It is threatened by habitat loss. It is found in the states of Alagoas, Paraiba, and Pernambuco. The further exploitation of Pouteria bapeba and other plants in Brazil will decrease biodiversity and negatively affect climate change.

References

Flora of Brazil
bapeba
Vulnerable plants
Taxonomy articles created by Polbot